The Electoral district of Daylesford was an electoral district of the Victorian Legislative Assembly. It included the town of Daylesford, around 155 km north-west of Melbourne.

It was merged, along with Maryborough, into the Electoral district of Maryborough and Daylesford in 1927. 

Members for Daylesford

 In the 1923 by-election, James McDonald of Labor was initially declared the winner, but a later recount established that Roderick McLeod had won.

Election results

See also
 Parliaments of the Australian states and territories
 List of members of the Victorian Legislative Assembly

References

Former electoral districts of Victoria (Australia)
1889 establishments in Australia
1927 disestablishments in Australia